Awake Our Souls is the second studio album by Tim Timmons. Reunion Records released the album on October 2, 2015.

Critical reception

Jamie Walker, giving the album four stars from CCM Magazine, describes, "Awake Our Souls, is an impressive sophomore offering...The entire collection from the whimsical to the contemplative, will leave fans encouraged wherever the road is leading." Awarding the album four stars at Worship Leader, Bobby Gilles states, "The mostly upbeat songs feature tight, clean production and a radio-friendly style that fits within the Christian adult contemporary boundaries...Timmons consistently reminds us that Christ is our loving, gracious king."

Indicating in a three and a half star review by Jesus Freak Hideout, Michael Weaver responds, "Awake Our Souls may not be your favorite album this year, but fans of today's CCM will definitely find enjoyment and some replay value." Jonathan Andre, rating the album four stars for 365 Days of Inspiring Media, writes, "Awake Our Souls, is just as much of a breath of fresh air (or rather more specifically, fresh sounds of acoustic guitars, enthusiastic vocals, and sound biblical truths) as his debut Provident album was."

Track listing

Chart performance

References

2015 albums
Reunion Records albums